Daniel Wa Wai How (born 25 July 1988) is a Malaysian politician. He is a member of Malaysian Chinese Association (MCA), a major component party of the Barisan Nasional (BN) coalition. 

Wa originally from Bentong, Pahang after having graduated in Economy Studies at the National University of Malaysia (UKM), was the personal assistant to Lee Chee Leong, the former Member of Parliament (MP) for Kampar, Perak. He was the youngest BN candidate when he first contested in the 2013 General Election at the age of 25. He had contested the state seat of Keranji in Perak then, but lost the poll to Democratic Action Party (DAP) of Pakatan Rakyat (PR) candidate, Chen Fook Chye. 

In the 2018 General Election he contested and lost again in the Keranji state seat to the DAP of Pakatan Harapan (PH) candidate. He was then elected in the 2018 MCA leadership election as one of the party Central Working Committee (CWC) members.

Election results

External links

References 

1988 births
Living people
People from Pahang
Malaysian people of Chinese descent
Malaysian Chinese Association politicians
National University of Malaysia alumni
21st-century Malaysian politicians